Diego Vargas (died October 1633) was a Roman Catholic prelate who served as Bishop of Potenza (1626–-1633).

Biography
On 20 July 1626, Diego Vargas was appointed by Pope Urban VIII as Bishop of Potenza. He served as Bishop of Potenza until his death in October 1633.

References

External links and additional sources
 (for Chronology of Bishops) 
 (for Chronology of Bishops)  

17th-century Italian Roman Catholic bishops
Bishops appointed by Pope Urban VIII
1633 deaths